Johnson Lee (born 11 April 1974) is a Hong Kong-Canadian TVB actor and celebrity impersonator.

Born in Hong Kong, Lee immigrated to Canada in 1984 and settled in the Toronto area. He graduated from the University of Toronto and studied animation in Canada before returning to Hong Kong in 1998. He began his entertainment career with Commercial Radio and trained as a comedian. He transitioned to an acting career with TVB in 2003.

Lee is the host and producer of the late night talk show Sze U Tonight which began airing on TVB in 2015, and in 2021 became host of Family Feud Hong Kong.

Filmography

TV dramas

Film

Reference

External links
Johnson Lee's Official TVB Blog

Johnson Lee at the Hong Kong Movie DataBase

1974 births
Living people
Hong Kong male film actors
Hong Kong male television actors
20th-century Hong Kong male actors
21st-century Hong Kong male actors
Hong Kong emigrants to Canada